The Art Gallery of Jan Gildemeester Jansz is a painting created by the Dutch painter Adriaan de Lelie in 1794–95. It is part of the collection of the Rijksmuseum Amsterdam, executed in oil paint on panel. It depicts the art collector Jan Gildemeester Jansz (or Jan Jansz. Gildemeester) in the midst of his large collection of paintings, showing them to friends.

The painting was acquired by the Rijksmuseum in 1964 after being part of a French private collection.

Art historical context and inspiration

Konstkamers
According to the art historian C.J. De Bruyn Knops, the subject of the work – an art collector at home, showing his art collection to his friends – is unique in Northern-Netherlandish painting before 1800. In Flemish (Southern-Netherlandish) painting, this genre was common in the 17th century; it was executed by masters like Willem van Haecht, David Teniers, Gillis van Tilborgh and Gonzales Cocques, but in the Northern Netherlands the subject didn't become popular. Probably Adriaan de Lelie had seen such works while studying in Antwerp. However, the Flemish 'konstkamers' ('art rooms') looked very different: they used to depict imaginary architecture, and probably not reality as seen by the painter. The Art Gallery of Jan Gildemeester Jansz, on the contrary, is a very accurate depiction of a real space.

Household scenes
Adriaan de Lelie follows the tradition of intimate household scenes that were painted very commonly in the Northern Netherlands since the 17th century. Usually, the people in such genre works are clearly striking a pose, while the visitors in The Art Gallery of Jan Gildemeester Jansz look very natural, as if they are unaware of the presence of the painter. Probably, De Lelie was inspired by English contemporaries here: Jan Jansz. Gildemeester possessed a 1773 engraving of a spontaneous group painting by Johan Zoffany, which must have been familiar to De Lelie.

Depicted space, people and artworks

The two rooms depicted in this painting still exist: the large room in front and the smaller one with windows in the back are part of the house that was owned by Jan Jansz. Gildemeester since 1792, currently a Rijksmonument located on Herengracht 475 in Amsterdam. The ceiling painting in the first room (by Jacob de Wit, 1731) the relief above the door and other decorations have been restored during a 20th-century renovation.

Jan Jansz. Gildemeester stands in the middle of the work. Adriaan de Lelie has probably portrayed himself kneeling on the right. Other people depicted in the work are possibly the Amsterdam-based art trader Pierre Fouquet Jr., Dutch physicist baron Cornelius Rudolphus Theodorus Krayenhoff (wearing a tricorne hat), painter Jurriaan Andriessen, tradesman Anthony Dull and his wife Marianne Dull-Dohrmann (sitting behind the easel on the left), and art collector and writer Bernardus de Bosch Jeronimosz. – according to C.J. De Bruyn Knops, the RKD and the Rijksmuseum's website, but this opinion is questioned by others.

As usual in that era, the paintings are arranged in rows, close to each other on the walls. It is highly likely that the visible artworks were chosen by the collector and painter together, specifically for this painting, and that they were considered the highlights from Gildemeesters collection. Many works in the first room can be identified with certainty. The art collection of Jan Jansz. Gildemeester was auctioned after his death in 1800, and the auction catalogue documents the works in quite a bit of detail. Gildemeester's taste as an art collector corresponds with that of his contemporaries: he mainly owned genre pieces, marine paintings, landscapes, animal and still-life paintings. His earliest purchases probably were drawings and prints, of which he also built a considerable collection.

See also
 List of works in the collection of Jan Gildemeester

References

External links
 The painting on the collection website of Rijksmuseum Amsterdam
 The painting on RKDimages
 The painting on Europeana
 Interactive visualization of this painting

Paintings in the collection of the Rijksmuseum
1790s paintings
Paintings of art galleries